The Cote House is a historic house on Goshen Center Road in Goshen, New Hampshire.  Built about 1846 as a schoolhouse, it is one of a cluster of plank-frame houses in Goshen.  The building served as a school until 1926, and is now a private residence.  The house was listed on the National Register of Historic Places in 1985.

Description and history
It is a -story wooden structure, with a gabled roof and clapboarded exterior. Each of its facades has two bays, most occupied by sash windows, with the main entrance on one of the gable ends.

The house was built about 1846, and originally served as the Goshen Center Schoolhouse.  It was built by John Chambers, a local housewright known to use the plank-framing technique.  The building served as a school until 1926, and is now a private residence.  It is one of three surviving 19th-century schoolhouses in the town, out of five built.

See also
National Register of Historic Places listings in Sullivan County, New Hampshire

References

Houses on the National Register of Historic Places in New Hampshire
Houses completed in 1846
Houses in Goshen, New Hampshire
National Register of Historic Places in Sullivan County, New Hampshire